Bekobar is  a census town in the Koderma CD block in the Koderma subdivision of  the Koderma district in the Indian state of Jharkhand.

Geography

Location                             

Overview
Koderma district is plateau territory and around 60% of the total area is covered with forests. The first dam of the Damodar Valley Corporation, at Tilaiya, was built across the Barakar River and inaugurated in 1953. Koderma Junction railway station has emerged as an important railway centre in the region. It is a predominantly rural district with only 19.72% urban population.

Note: The map alongside presents some of the notable locations in the district. All places marked in the map are linked in the larger full screen map.

Demographics
According to the 2011 Census of India, Bekobar had a total population of 7,184, of which 3,629 (51%) were males and 3555 (49%) were females. Population in the age range 0–6 years was 1,414. The total number of literate persons in Bekobar  was 3,565 (73.85% of the population over 6 years).

Infrastructure
According to the District Census Handbook 2011, Kodarma, Bekobar covered an area of 7 km2. Among the civic amenities, it had 19 km roads with open drains, the protected water supply involved uncovered well, hand pump. It had 800 domestic electric connections. Among the educational facilities it had 2 primary schools, 2 middle schools, 2 secondary schools, the nearest senior secondary school at Koderma 4 km away.

References

Cities and towns in Koderma district